The Netherlands men's national 3x3 team is the 3x3 basketball team representing Netherlands in international men's competitions, organized and run by the Nederlandse Basketball Bond.

Competitions

Summer Olympics

World Cup

European Championships

Team

Current roster

|}
| valign="top" |
 Head coach

 Assistant coach

Legend
(C) Team captain
Age – describes ageon 22 June 2022
|}

List of players
This list contains all players who played for the Netherlands 3x3 team:

World rankings

Updated as of 13 May 2017

See also
 Netherlands men's national basketball team

References

External links

Basketball in the Netherlands
Men's national 3x3 basketball teams
B